Sano may refer to:

Geography
Sano, Kentucky, U.S.
Sano, Tochigi, Japan
Monte Sano Mountain, a mountain in Alabama, United States
Monte Sano State Park
Wai Sano, a volcano in Flores, Indonesia

Fiction
Sano (Rurouni Kenshin), a character in Rurouni Kenshin media
Sano Ichirō, a samurai detective from a mystery novel series by Laura Joh Rowland
Izumi Sano, a character from the manga series Hana-Kimi by Hisaya Nakajo
Seiichhiro Sano, a character from The Law of Ueki

Other uses
Sano (company), an Israeli manufacturer of chemical products
Sano (surname), Japanese surname
Sano di Pietro (1406–1481), early Italian Renaissance painter
A defunct brand of cigarettes from United States Tobacco Company endorsed by Martin Kane, Private Eye

See also
 

Japanese-language surnames